Charles P. Ries (born 1951) is the vice president, International  at the Rand Corporation.

Diplomatic career 

He was the United States Minister for Economic Affairs and Coordinator for Economic Transition in Iraq, serving at American Embassy Baghdad.

Ries served as U.S. Ambassador to Greece (2004–07) and Principal Deputy Assistant Secretary of State for European Affairs (2000–04), in the latter capacity overseeing the U.S.-European Union relationship, economics, energy, and public diplomacy.

Ries had earlier assignments in London, Brussels, Ankara and the Santo Domingo.  He was detailed to USTR as Deputy Assistant U.S. Trade Representative for North American Affairs and was a member of the North American Free Trade Agreement (NAFTA) negotiating team.  At State Department headquarters, Ries worked on international energy and G-7/G-8 Summits, among other issues.

Education 
He attended Asheville School.
Ries holds B.A. and M.A. degrees from the Johns Hopkins University.

Personal 
Ries is married to Marcie Berman Ries, the former U.S. ambassador to Bulgaria.

See also 
Embassy of the United States in Baghdad
Embassy of the United States in Athens
United States Ambassador to Greece

References

External links

Johns Hopkins University alumni
Ambassadors of the United States to Greece
1951 births
Living people
Asheville School alumni
Paul H. Nitze School of Advanced International Studies alumni